Bircham Tofts is one of the three villages that make up the civil parish of Bircham, in the west of the English county of Norfolk. The village is located about 1 km east of the village of Great Bircham, 20 km north-east of the town of King's Lynn, and 60 km north-west of the city of Norwich. In 1931 the parish had a population of 96. On 1 April 1935 the parish was abolished to form Bircham.

The villages name means 'Bircham's curtilage'.

References

 Ordnance Survey (2002). OS Explorer Map 250 - Norfolk Coast West. .

External links

Information from Genuki Norfolk on Bircham Tofts

Villages in Norfolk
Former civil parishes in Norfolk
King's Lynn and West Norfolk